Josh Diekmann (born October 9, 1976) is a retired American mixed martial artist. A professional competitor from 2005 until 2016, Diekmann fought in Bellator MMA, the WEC, and CES MMA. Known for being an exciting heavyweight, only one bout during his career ended in a judges' decision.

Background
Born and raised in Westerly, Rhode Island, Diekmann, who is of Italian descent, graduated from Westerly High School in 1995. Diekmann began training in 2002 at the age of 26 at Whaling City Boxing in Waterford, Connecticut, which is owned by Kent Ward, father of current Bellator Welterweight Brennan Ward.

Mixed martial arts career

Early career
Diekmann had one amateur fight against future UFC competitor Sean Gannon, a Boston police officer best known for defeating Kimbo Slice in non-sanctioned bout. Diekmann lost via TKO in the first round. Diekmann later turned professional in 2005, he won his first six bouts by stoppage before losing to Justin Eilers via TKO at WEC 24. Diekmann would then go 6–2 in his next eight bouts.

CES MMA
Diekmann faced Josh Hendricks on February 3, 2012 at CES MMA: Extreme Measures. Diekmann would lose via submission in the first round.

The following October, Diekmann was defeated by Tyler King via unanimous decision at CES MMA: Real Pain.

Diekmann got his first win for the promotion when he defeated Chris Guillen via first-round TKO at CES MMA: November to Remember.

Diekmann was scheduled to face Keith Bell at CES MMA 23 on April 25, 2014. The bout was cancelled for unknown reasons.

Bellator MMA
Diekmann signed a six-fight contract with Bellator MMA and made his Bellator debut on September 7, 2013 at Bellator 98, defeating Parker Porter via TKO in the first round.

Diekmann was expected to face Chris Birchler at Bellator 110 on February 28, 2014. However, the fight was cancelled for unknown reasons. Diekmann was then expected to face Chad Herrick on the same card, however, this bout also did not happen due to unknown reasons. Instead, Diekmann faced Manny Lara and the fight ended in a no contest due to an accidental eye poke in round one.

Diekmann faced Mike Wessel at Bellator 123 on September 5, 2014. Diekmann won the fight via knockout in the first round.

Diekmann faced Raphael Butler on February 27, 2015 at Bellator 134. He lost the fight by submission in the first round.

Personal life
Diekmann, who is married and has children, also currently works as a mason. Diekmann lives with his family in Groton, Connecticut.

Mixed martial arts record

|-
|Loss
|align=center| 15–8 (1)
|Tyler King
|Submission (rear-naked choke)
|Bellator 163
|
|align=center|2
|align=center|1:39
|Uncasville, Connecticut, United States
|
|-
|Loss
|align=center| 15–7 (1)
|Ashley Gooch
|Submission (rear-naked choke)
|CES 32: de Freitas vs. Curtis
|
|align=center|1
|align=center|4:30
|Lincoln, Rhode Island, United States
|
|-
|Loss
|align=center| 15–6 (1)
|Raphael Butler
|Submission (standing guillotine choke)
|Bellator 134
|
|align=center|1
|align=center|1:04
|Uncasville, Connecticut, United States
|
|-
| Win
| align=center| 15–5 (1)
| Mike Wessel
| KO (punches)
| Bellator 123
| 
| align=center| 1
| align=center| 0:47
| Uncasville, Connecticut, United States 
| 
|-
| NC
| align=center| 14–5 (1)
| Manny Lara
| NC (accidental eye poke)
| Bellator 110
| 
| align=center| 1
| align=center| 0:18
| Uncasville, Connecticut, United States 
| 
|-
| Win
| align=center| 14–5
| Chris Guillen
| TKO (punches)
| CES MMA: November to Remember
| 
| align=center| 1
| align=center| 1:15
| Ledyard, Connecticut, United States 
| 
|-
| Win
| align=center| 13–5
| Parker Porter
| TKO (punches)
| Bellator 98
| 
| align=center| 1
| align=center| 1:12
| Uncasville, Connecticut, United States 
| 
|-
| Loss
| align=center| 12–5
| Tyler King
| Decision (unanimous)
| CES MMA: Real Pain
| 
| align=center| 3
| align=center| 5:00
| Providence, Rhode Island, United States
| 
|-
| Loss
| align=center| 12–4
| Josh Hendricks
| Submission (arm-triangle choke)
| CES MMA: Extreme Measures
| 
| align=center| 1
| align=center| 2:21
| Lincoln, Rhode Island, United States
| 
|-
| Win
| align=center| 12–3
| Randy Smith
| TKO (punches)
| CFX 13: Rumble in the Jungle 5
| 
| align=center| 1
| align=center| 0:12
| Plymouth, Massachusetts, United States 
|Won the vacant CFX Heavyweight Championship.
|-
| Win
| align=center| 11–3
| Bobby Favors
| KO (punches)
| CFX 8: Rumble in the Jungle 3
| 
| align=center| 2
| align=center| 3:42
| Plymouth, Massachusetts, United States 
| 
|-
| Loss
| align=center| 10–3
| Christian Morecraft
| Submission (rear-naked choke)
| CFX 6: Rumble in the Jungle 2
| 
| align=center| 1
| align=center| 0:56
| Plymouth, Massachusetts, United States 
| 
|-
| Win
| align=center| 10–2
| David Woodby
| TKO (punches)
| USFL: War in the Woods 4
| 
| align=center| 1
| align=center| 1:01
| Ledyard, Connecticut, United States
| 
|-
| Loss
| align=center| 9–2
| Chris Guillen
| Submission (rear-naked choke)
| IFO: Kimmons vs. Yunker
| 
| align=center| 2
| align=center| 0:40
| Las Vegas, Nevada, United States
| 
|-
| Win
| align=center| 9–1
| Pat Schultz
| KO (punches)
| FFP: Untamed 14
| 
| align=center| 1
| align=center| 0:45
| Plymouth, Massachusetts, United States 
|Won the vacant FFP Heavyweight Championship.
|-
| Win
| align=center| 8–1
| Daron Adams
| TKO (punches)
| WFL 15: Winter Brawl 2007
| 
| align=center| 1
| align=center| 0:54
| Revere, Massachusetts, United States 
| 
|-
| Win
| align=center| 7–1
| Shane McClure
| Submission (armbar)
| CZ 19: Above and Beyond
| 
| align=center| 1
| align=center| 1:08
| Revere, Massachusetts, United States 
|Defended the CZ Heavyweight Championship.
|-
| Loss
| align=center| 6–1
| Justin Eilers
| TKO (punches)
| WEC 24
| 
| align=center| 1
| align=center| 2:29
| Lemoore, California, United States
| 
|-
| Win
| align=center| 6–0
| Chris Herring
| TKO (submission to punches)
| CZ 13: Battle Cry
| 
| align=center| 1
| align=center| 0:56
| Revere, Massachusetts, United States 
|Won the vacant CZ Heavyweight Championship.
|-
| Win
| align=center| 5–0
| Kevin Jordan
| TKO (injury)
| FFP: Untamed 3
| 
| align=center| 1
| align=center| 0:10
| Brockton, Massachusetts, United States 
| 
|-
| Win
| align=center| 4–0
| Dana Blouin
| KO (punch)
| WFL 5: Winter Brawl 2006
| 
| align=center| 1
| align=center| N/A
| Revere, Massachusetts, United States 
| 
|-
| Win
| align=center| 3–0
| David Woodby
| Submission (rear-naked choke)
| Mass Destruction 21
| 
| align=center| 1
| align=center| 2:35
| Fall River, Massachusetts, United States
| 
|-
| Win
| align=center| 2–0
| Richard Wilson
| Submission (armbar)
| CZ 11: Blood Brothers
| 
| align=center| 1
| align=center| 0:33
| Revere, Massachusetts, United States
| 
|-
| Win
| align=center| 1–0
| Joe Gomes
| TKO (punches)
| WFL 1: Winter Brawl 2005
| 
| align=center| 1
| align=center| 0:24
| Revere, Massachusetts, United States 
|

References

Living people
1976 births
American male mixed martial artists
Heavyweight mixed martial artists
Mixed martial artists utilizing boxing
People from Westerly, Rhode Island
Mixed martial artists from Rhode Island
People from Groton, Connecticut